Repinirast (INN; marketed under the tradename Romet) is an antihistamine.

References

External links
Product information from Antia Laboratories Inc.

H1 receptor antagonists
4-Pyrones